Matthew Cook (November 10, 1987 – April 4, 2010) was a Canadian ice sledge hockey player.

Before the age of 18, Cook played Junior A for the Bonnyville Pontiacs of the Alberta Junior Hockey League. He had his leg amputated below the knee in 2006, at the age of 18, after unsuccessful chemotherapy when doctors discovered cancer on his left leg. Cook began playing ice sledge hockey in 2007, at a Team Alberta Summer development camp.

Cook was a member of the Canada men's national ice sledge hockey team, first making the team in September 2008. He won bronze with them in the 2009 World Championships.

He was expected to participate in the 2010 Paralympic Winter Games in Vancouver, but the cancer returned in the summer of 2009, and after surgery, and recovery, the bone cancer returned again, and he died on April 4, 2010.

References

External links
 Matthew Cook player profile at the Canadian Paralympic Committee

1987 births
2010 deaths
Canadian sledge hockey players
Deaths from cancer in Alberta
Deaths from bone cancer
Sportspeople from Edmonton